Seeing the World (also known as A Roamin' Holiday) is a 1927 silent Our Gang film, directed by Robert F. McGowan and Anthony Mack. It was the 57th Our Gang short subject released. The film features James Finlayson and also a brief appearance by Stan Laurel, who later wrote: That "Seeing the World" is a very bad film, plus the print - I felt sorry for Finlayson practically working alone with nothing funny to do - He made every face in the book in this one.!!

Plot
The gang's teacher (James Finlayson) is trying to win a trip to Europe. He does win, but the gang accompanies him as well, which causes his trip to become a nightmare. The group treks through Venice, Rome, Pompeii, Naples, and London. Finally, the entourage ends up in Paris, where Farina manages to falls off the side of the Eiffel Tower. Finlayson tries desperately tries to rescue Farina, leading him to wake up from what was apparently a daydream caused by the gang tossing sleeping pills into his water.

Cast

The Gang
 Joe Cobb as Joe
 Jackie Condon as Jackie
 Johnny Downs as Johnny
 Allen Hoskins as Farina
 Scooter Lowry as Skooter
 Jay R. Smith as Jay
 Peggy Eames as Peggy

Additional cast
 James Finlayson as James Finlayson, The schoolteacher
 Jean Darling as Extra at pier
 Ed Brandenburg as Window washer
 Frank Butler as English pedestrian
 Dorothy Darling as Extra at pier
 Charlie Hall as English chauffeur
 Ham Kinsey as Ship's official
 Stan Laurel as English pedestrian
 Charles McMurphy as Ship's official
 Charley Young as Extra at pier
 David, Prince of Wales as himself (stock footage)
 Gaston Doumergue as himself (stock footage)
 Yusef of Morocco as himself (stock footage)

See also
 Our Gang filmography
 Stan Laurel filmography

References

External links

1927 films
Hal Roach Studios short films
American silent short films
American black-and-white films
1927 comedy films
Films directed by Robert F. McGowan
1927 short films
Our Gang films
1920s American films
Silent American comedy films
1920s English-language films